Copper was an unincorporated community and now a ghost town in Wallowa County, Oregon on the bank of the Snake River.

Still operating in the former community is the Copper Creek Lodge.

References 

Ghost towns in Oregon
Unincorporated communities in Wallowa County, Oregon
Unincorporated communities in Oregon